St. Agnes Academy ) is a private Catholic basic education institution run by the Congregation of the Missionary Benedictine Sisters of Tutzing in Legazpi City Albay Philippines. It was founded in 1912 and is the oldest Catholic school in the province of Albay, Bicol, Philippines.

The school provides education for kindergarten, preschool, elementary and high school. The school is a co-educational institution. In its early history, the school was an all-girls school but in the 1980s, its enrolment was opened to male students.

St. Agnes Academy had its centennial celebration in the school year 2012–2013.

St. Agnes Academy's Basic Education program was granted re-accreditation by the Philippine Accrediting Association of Schools Colleges and Universities (PAASCU) until February 2025.

Notable alumni
 Geraldine Schaer Bonnevie - actress
 Angela Manalang-Gloria - poet
 Loida Nicolas Lewis - industrialist

References

Catholic elementary schools in the Philippines
Catholic secondary schools in the Philippines
Education in Legazpi, Albay
Schools in Albay
Educational institutions established in 1912
1912 establishments in the Philippines